The Painters Arms is a Grade II listed pub in Luton, England.

It is on the Campaign for Real Ale's National Inventory of Historic Pub Interiors.

It was rebuilt in 1913.

Seán Ó Roideacháin's poem 'High Town Road' (or 'Baile Ard Luton' in Irish) is about Irish emigrants in The Painters Arms and The Freeholder on High Town Road during the late 1980s.

References

Pubs in Bedfordshire
Grade II listed pubs in Bedfordshire
National Inventory Pubs
Listed buildings in Luton